Probus (died 306) was Bishop of Byzantium from 293 to 306.

References

306 deaths
Year of birth unknown
Bishops of Byzantium
3rd-century Romans
4th-century Byzantine bishops